David Wilson Campbell (born January 14, 1942) is an American former baseball player and sportscaster. He played parts of eight seasons in Major League Baseball (MLB), primarily as an infielder for the San Diego Padres. He was nicknamed "Soup", a reference to the brand name Campbell's Soup.

Biography

He played as a utility infielder for the Tigers, San Diego Padres, St. Louis Cardinals, and Houston Astros in a major league career that spanned eight seasons, 1967 to 1974.

In the late 1970s, Campbell began a career in broadcasting, doing radio play-by-play for the Padres as well as San Diego State football and basketball. In the 1990s, he was the Colorado Rockies' color commentator, and from 1990 to 2010 he worked for ESPN as a color commentator for the network's television and radio coverage of Major League Baseball (most notably on ESPN Radio's national Sunday Night Baseball broadcasts), as well as a commentator on Baseball Tonight and other studio shows. His voice can also be heard in two video game series, MLB: The Show and 989 Sports MLB for PlayStation 3, PlayStation 2, PlayStation, and PlayStation Portable. In 2021 Baseball Hall of Fame balloting, Campbell was a finalist for the Ford C. Frick Award, presented annually by the National Baseball Hall of Fame.

References

External links

Dave Campbell at SABR (Baseball BioProject)

1942 births
Living people
Baseball players from Michigan
College basketball announcers in the United States
Colorado Rockies announcers
Detroit Tigers players
Houston Astros players
Major League Baseball broadcasters
Major League Baseball second basemen
Michigan Wolverines baseball players
People from Manistee, Michigan
San Diego Padres announcers
San Diego Padres players
San Diego State Aztecs football announcers
St. Louis Cardinals players
Syracuse Chiefs players
Toledo Mud Hens players
Lakeland Tigers players
Knoxville Smokies players
Montgomery Rebels players
Amarillo Gold Sox players